Shlomo Shirazi (born 20 June 1960) is an Israeli former footballer. He played eleven times for the Israel national team.

Honours
Israeli Premier League (2):
1982–83, 1986–87
League Cup (2):
1982–83, 1983–84
Israeli Supercup (1):
1983
Israel State Cup (3):
1985, 1986, 1989

References

External links
 

1960 births
Living people
Israeli Jews
Israeli footballers
Israel international footballers
Maccabi Netanya F.C. players
Maccabi Jaffa F.C. players
Beitar Jerusalem F.C. players
Hapoel Rishon LeZion F.C. players
Footballers from Netanya
Israeli people of Moroccan-Jewish descent
Liga Leumit players
Association football defenders